Jiangqian Township (Mandarin: 江千乡) is a township in Gadê County, Golog Tibetan Autonomous Prefecture, Qinghai, China. In 2010, Jiangqian Township had a total population of 3,462 people: 1,702 males and 1,760 females: 951 under 14 years old, 2,328 aged between 15 and 64 and 183 over 65 years old.

References 

Township-level divisions of Qinghai
Golog Tibetan Autonomous Prefecture